Sergey Yanin (born 14 October 1953) is a Soviet ski jumper. He competed in the large hill event at the 1972 Winter Olympics.

References

1953 births
Living people
Soviet male ski jumpers
Olympic ski jumpers of the Soviet Union
Ski jumpers at the 1972 Winter Olympics
People from Sverdlovsk